The Camel Boy is a 1984 Australian animated feature film.

Plot
Young Ali and his camel-driver grandfather Moussa take part in an expedition through the Australian Outback. Faced with prejudice, Moussa's knowledge and the hardiness of his camels in the punishing conditions quickly prove vital to both the success of the expedition and the survival of its members.

Cast
Barbara Frawley
John Meillon
Robyn Moore
Michael Pate
Ron Haddrick as O'Connell

References

External links

The Camel Boy at Oz Movies

1984 films
Australian animated feature films
Films with live action and animation
Films directed by Yoram Gross
1984 animated films
1980s Australian animated films
Australian children's animated films
1980s English-language films
Flying Bark Productions films